Jerjer (translated as "lady"/"beauty"; 31 May 1599 – 28 May 1649), of the Khorchin Mongol Borjigit clan, was the consort of Hong Taiji. She was seven years his junior. Jerjer was empress consort of Qing from 1636 until her husband's death in 1643, after which she was known as Empress dowager. She was posthumously honoured with the title Empress Xiaoduanwen.

Life

Family background
 Father: Manggusi, held the title of a first rank prince
 Paternal grandfather: Namusai, held the title of a third rank prince
 Mother: Gunbu
 One elder brother and one younger brother
 Two younger sisters

Wanli era
Jerjer was born on the eighth day of the intercalary fourth lunar month in the 27th year of the reign of the Wanli Emperor, which translates to 31 May 1599 in the Gregorian calendar.

On 28 May 1614, Jerjer married Hong Taiji and became one of his multiple wives.

Tianming era
In 1623, Hong Taiji divorced his second primary consort, and elevated Jerjer to the position.

Lady Borjigit's niece, Bumbutai, the future Empress Dowager Zhaosheng, would marry Hong Taiji in March or April 1625.

Jerjer gave birth in 1625 to Hong Taiji's second daughter, Princess Wenzhuang of the First Rank, on 2 August 1628 to his third daughter, Princess Jingduan of the First Rank, and on 7 October 1634 to his eighth daughter, Princess Yong'an of the First Rank.

Another niece, Harjol, the future primary consort Minhui, would marry Hong Taiji on 6 December 1634.

Chongde era
When Hong Taiji conferred titles on his five primary spouses in August 1636, he instated Jerjer as his empress.

Shunzhi era
Following Hong Taiji's death on 21 September 1643, Jerjer was honoured as "Mother Empress, Empress Dowager" by the Shunzhi Emperor, Hong Taiji's ninth son and successor. The emperor's birth mother, Bumbutai, was similarly honoured as "Holy Mother, Empress Dowager".

Jerjer died on 28 May 1649 and was interred in the Zhao Mausoleum. She was posthumously honoured with the title "Empress Xiaoduanwen".

Titles
 During the reign of the Wanli Emperor (r. 1572–1620):
 Lady Borjigit (from 31 May 1599)
 Secondary consort (from 28 May 1614)
 During the reign of Nurhaci (r. 1616–1626):
 Primary consort (from 1623)
 During the reign of Hong Taiji (r. 1626–1643):
 Empress (from August 1636)
 During the reign of the Shunzhi Emperor (r. 1643–1661):
 Empress Dowager (from 21 September 1643)
 Empress Xiaoduanwen (from 1649)

Issue
 As primary consort:
 Princess Wenzhuang of the First Rank (10 September 1625 – April/May 1663), personal name Makata, Hong Taiji's second daughter
 Married Ejei (d. 1641) of the Chahar Borjigit clan on 16 February 1636
 Married Abunai (1635–1675) of the Chahar Borjigit clan in 1645
 Princess Jingduan of the First Rank (2 August 1628 – June/July 1686), Hong Taiji's third daughter
 Married Kitad (d. 1653) of the Khorchin Borjigit clan in 1639
 Princess Yong'an of the First Rank (7 October 1634 – February/March 1692), Hong Taiji's eighth daughter
 Married Bayasihulang of the Khorchin Borjigit clan in 1645

In fiction and popular culture
 Portrayed by Mang Lai-ping in The Rise and Fall of Qing Dynasty (1987)
 Portrayed by Wu Qianqian in Xiaozhuang Mishi (2003)
 Portrayed by Wang Yanhui in Rule the World (2017)

See also
 Ranks of imperial consorts in China#Qing
 Royal and noble ranks of the Qing dynasty

Notes

References
 
 
 

1599 births
1649 deaths
Qing dynasty empresses
Manchu nobility
Borjigin
16th-century Chinese women
16th-century Chinese people
17th-century Chinese women
17th-century Chinese people
16th-century Mongolian women
17th-century Mongolian women
Consorts of Hong Taiji